Decatur O. Davis House is a historic home located in Richmond, Virginia.  It was designed by architect Albert Lawrence West and built in 1879. It is a three-story, three bay, Second Empire style brick dwelling with a mansard roof. It has an offset, two-story south wing. It features granite and iron ornamentation and a rare rinceau cast-iron fence.

It was listed on the National Register of Historic Places in 2000.

References

Houses on the National Register of Historic Places in Virginia
Second Empire architecture in Virginia
Houses completed in 1879
Houses in Richmond, Virginia
National Register of Historic Places in Richmond, Virginia